Birni-N'Konni (sometimes shortened as Bkonni) is a department of the Tahoua Region in Niger. Its capital lies at the city of Birni-N'Konni. As of 2011, the department had a total population of 504,783 people.

Towns and villages 

 Birni-N'Konni
 Doguerawa
 Galmi
 Malbaza
 Sabonga

References

Departments of Niger
Tahoua Region